Sraboner Dhara is an Indian Bengali drama film directed by Sudeshna Roy and Abhijit Guha. Starring Soumitra Chatterjee and Parambrata Chatterjee, the film deals with Alzheimer's disease, the issues faced by the younger generation, and the emotional attachment established with the medical caregivers of the older generation. It is based on Dr. Subhendu Sen's short story, Between Raindrops and scripted by Padmanabha Dasgupta.

The film was selected to compete at the Kolkata International Film Festival under the Asian Select category. The film released theatrically on 7 February 2020.

Cast 

 Soumitra Chatterjee as Amitava Sarkar
 Parambrata Chatterjee as Dr. Nilabho Roy
 Gargi Roychowdhury as Shuva Sarkar (Amitava Sarkar's wife)
 Basabdatta Chatterjee as Pritha Roy

Promotion and release

The official trailer of the film was launched by Amara Muzik Bengal on 17 January 2020. The film released theatrically on 7 February 2020.

References

External links
 
Bengali-language Indian films
Indian drama films
2020 films
Indian films about Alzheimer's disease
2020s Bengali-language films
2020 drama films